Fimbristylis aestivalis commonly known as summer fimbry, is a sedge of the family Cyperaceae that is native to Australia. The specific epithet, aestivalis, is derived from Latin and means "pertaining to the summer".

It blooms between June and July and produces brown flowers.

In Western Australia it is found along creeks and in other damp areas in the Kimberley region where it grows in alluvium.

References

External links 
 Fimbristylis aestivalis at the Atlas of Living Australia

Plants described in 1805
Flora of Western Australia
Aestivalis
Endemic flora of Australia